Lend Me A Tenor is a musical with book and Lyrics by Peter Sham and music by Brad Carroll. The musical is based on the 1986 play of the same name by Ken Ludwig. There are several notable changes from the play turning it into a full-on musical comedy. Changes include major plot revisions between Tito Merrelli (opera star) and Saunders (opera director), eliminating Frank the Bellhop (one of the lead roles in the play), adding the role of Bernie, the stage manager, expanding the role of Julia into a musical trio of Saunders' three ex-wives, upping the mistaken identity farce from two to the magic number of three and making every character more three-dimensional than the original play. In 2014, it was revised, the musical now changes the opera within the musical to Pagliacci; this change removes questionable elements from Ludwig's play, raising the hilarity to three men running around as opera clowns (Canios) rather than dressed as Otellos.

Productions
Lend Me A Tenor was presented in May 2006 as a staged reading as part of the Utah Shakespeare Festival's New American Playwright Project, in Cedar City, Utah, followed by rewrites and a production as part of USF's Summer 2007 repertory season, which received rave reviews.

The show had an out of town tryout at the Theatre Royal, Plymouth running from 24 September to 6 October 2010, directed by Ian Talbot and choreographed by Randy Skinner. The show began previews in London's West End at the Gielgud Theatre, the same venue where the original play premièred in 1986 on 2 June 2011 before officially opening on 15 June 2011. The show closed on 6 August 2011, with producers Martin Platt and David Elliott stating that "despite mostly wonderful notices from the press, great feedback from our audiences and nightly standing ovations, this has not translated into growing sales and we feel it is in everyone's best interests to close the production on August 6th."

Musical numbers

 Act I
 Overture — Orchestra
 "Verdi's Otello/I/1" — Ensemble
 "Where the Hell is Merelli?" — Saunders, Max & Ensemble
 "Fling" — Maggie & Max
 "Where the Hell is Merelli?" (Reprise) — The Opera Guild Ladies
 "How 'Bout Me?" — Max & Saunders
 "For the Love of Opera" — Ensemble
 "Facciamo L'Amor" — Tito & Maria
 "The Last Time" — Maria
 "Be You'self" — Tito & Max
 "Before You Know It" — Max
 "How 'Bout Me?" — Saunders & Max
 Act I Finale — Saunders, Max & Ensemble

 Act II
 Entr'acte — Orchestra
 "Il Stupendo" — Ensemble
 "Lend Me a Tenor" — Maggie & Max
 "May I Have a Moment?" — Diana & Tito
 "Il Stupendo" (Reprise) — Maggie, Max, Diana & Saunders
 "Il Stupendo" (Reprise) — The Opera Guild Ladies, Tito & Ensemble
 "Knowing What I Know" — Max
 "The Last Time" (Reprise) — Maria
 Finale — Company

Original London Cast

Awards and nominations

Original London production

References

External links
Official Website

West End musicals
2007 musicals
Musicals based on plays